Hajah Khairin Nisa binti Ismail is a Malaysian lawyer and politician. A member of the United Malays National Organisation (UMNO), she is the Member of the Johor State Legislative Assembly for Serom since 2022.

Career 
Before joining politics, she graduated from International Islamic University (IIU) and opened a law firm named after her, Khairin-Nisa & Co., in Muar, Johor on 23 May 1990.

In the 2022 Johor state election, she contested for Serom under the Barisan Nasional (BN) banner and defeated 4 other candidates — Rahmat Daud from the Perikatan Nasional (PN), Asim Abdullah from the Pakatan Harapan (PH), and Azim Malek from the Homeland Fighters' Party (PEJUANG). Within her party, she also serves Women Division Chief in Ledang.

She sworn as one of the Johor State Executive Councilor on 26 March 2022.

References

External links 
 Khairin Nisa on Facebook

Living people
Malaysian politicians
Malaysian people of Malay descent
Year of birth missing (living people)